Live at the Jazz Café is a live album released in 1998 by ProjeKct One, a sub-group of King Crimson. Live at the Jazz Café was included as part of the 1999 box set The ProjeKcts.

Overview

The original material for the album was recorded live from 1 to 4 December 1997, during a four-night tour of improvisations at the famous Jazz Café in Camden Town, London, England. The same sessions provided material for the later Jazz Café Suite album.

Track listing
The tracks' titles naming scheme is "night, set, improv" : for instance, "3 i 2" was recorded on the 3rd concert night (which is also 3 December), on the first set, and was its 2nd improvisation.

"4 i 1"  – 6:11 
"4 ii 1"  – 3:29
"1 ii 2"  – 4:27
"4 ii 4"  – 7:28
"2 ii 3"  – 4:27
"3 i 2"  – 8:14
"3 ii 2"  – 6:32
"2 ii 4"  – 4:27
"4 i 3"  – 4:32

All titles written by Robert Fripp, Bill Bruford, Tony Levin, Trey Gunn.

Personnel
 Tony Levin – bass, Stick, synth
 Trey Gunn – Warr Guitar
 Bill Bruford – drums, percussion
 Robert Fripp – guitar
 Ronan Chris Murphy – mixing, editing

References

External links
 User comments of The ProjeKcts at Elephant-Talk

ProjeKcts
1998 live albums
King Crimson live albums